Qerqereh (also Romanized as Ghorghoreh and Qorqoreh) is a village in Golbibi Rural District, Marzdaran District, Sarakhs County, Razavi Khorasan Province, Iran. At the 2006 census, its population was 145, in 37 families.

References 

Populated places in Sarakhs County